The Administrator of Tokelau is an official of the New Zealand Government, responsible for supervising the government of the dependent territory of Tokelau.

Powers and functions
Certain of the Administrator's powers and functions are set forth in the Tokelau Act 1948, as amended from time to time. (The office of Administrator is not, however, created by this Act.) The most important power of the Administrator is the power to disallow any Rule passed by the Parliament of Tokelau (the General Fono); this must, however, be done within 30 days after the Administrator is sent a copy of the Rule.

The Administrator is assisted by a permanent staff of civil servants, which form the Office of the Administrator of Tokelau, a part of the Ministry of Foreign Affairs and Trade. The Office coordinates New Zealand government activity relating to Tokelau, especially economic assistance; provides expert policy advice and assistance to the Tokelau government, also arranging for administrative assistance and training to the Tokelau public service; and represents the Tokelau public service in New Zealand, especially to the resident Tokelauan community. Besides these roles, the Office assists Tokelau to develop appropriate legal, governance and administration structures as Tokelau moves towards greater autonomy.

The Administrator acts as a representative, not of the King personally, but of the New Zealand Government. The Administration of Tokelau may also be overruled by the New Zealand Parliament, or by regulations made by the Governor-General in Council.

Appointment
The Administrator is appointed by the New Zealand Minister of Foreign Affairs.

History

The region of the Pacific Ocean in which Tokelau lies was declared a British protectorate in 1877, and the islands themselves came under British protection in 1889, being incorporated into the Gilbert and Ellice Islands Colony. This Colony was administered by officials responsible ultimately to the Colonial Office in London.

In 1925, Tokelau was separated from the Gilbert and Ellice Islands, becoming its own colony. In reality, however, it was administered from New Zealand, the Governor-General of New Zealand being appointed Governor of Tokelau. The Governor-General at the time, Sir Charles Fergusson, the next year appointed the High Commissioner of Western Samoa, Maj Gen Sir George Spafford Richardson, as Administrator, with a delegation of the Vice-Regal powers. This situation continued up until 1948, when sovereignty over Tokelau was transferred from the United Kingdom to New Zealand.

In recent years, Administrators have tended to be senior civil servants, politicians, or career diplomats.

List of administrators (1926–present)
Up to 1961, the administrator of Tokelau was the administrator of Samoa.

See also
Administrator of the Government
Heads of Government of Tokelau

References

External links
NZ Ministry of Foreign Affairs and Trade — List of Administrators of the Tokelau Islands

Tokelau, List of Administrators of

Administrator
1926 establishments in New Zealand
1926 establishments in Tokelau
Tokelau